Bison is an outdoor 1902 bronze sculpture of a bison by German sculptor Rudolf Siemering, installed in Tiergarten, Berlin, Germany.

See also

 1902 in art

External links
 

1902 establishments in Germany
1902 sculptures
Animal sculptures in Germany
Bronze sculptures in Germany
Bison in art
Mitte
Outdoor sculptures in Berlin
Statues in Germany
Works by German people
Tiergarten (park)